In Greek mythology, Deioneus (Ancient Greek: Δηιονεύς means "ravager") or Deion is a name attributed to the following individuals:

Deioneus, king of Phocis and son of King Aeolus of Aeolia and Enarete, daughter of Deimachus. He was the brother of Salmoneus, Sisyphus, Cretheus, Perieres, Athamas, Magnes, Calyce, Canace, Alcyone, Pisidice and Perimede. By Diomede, Deioneus became the father of Cephalus, Actor, Aenetus, Phylacus, Asterodia and Philonis. After the death of his brother, Salmoneus, Deioneus took his daughter Tyro into his house, and gave her in marriage to Cretheus.
Deioneus, the Perrhaebian father of Dia and father-in-law-to-be of Ixion, Deioneus was pushed by him into a bed of flaming coals so that Ixion wouldn't have to pay the bride price. Also known as Eioneus.
Deion, father of Nisus, king of Megara. Otherwise, the latter was called the son of Pandion II or Ares.
Deioneus, an Oeachalian prince as son of King Eurytus and Antiope or Antioche, and thus brother to Iole, Toxeus, Clytius, Didaeon and Iphitos. He married Perigune, daughter of Sinis, whose father was killed by Theseus.
Deioneus, one of the sons of Heracles and Megara.

Notes

References 

Apollodorus, The Library with an English Translation by Sir James George Frazer, F.B.A., F.R.S. in 2 Volumes, Cambridge, MA, Harvard University Press; London, William Heinemann Ltd. 1921. ISBN 0-674-99135-4. Online version at the Perseus Digital Library. Greek text available from the same website.
Apollonius Rhodius, Argonautica translated by Robert Cooper Seaton (1853-1915), R. C. Loeb Classical Library Volume 001. London, William Heinemann Ltd, 1912. Online version at the Topos Text Project.
Apollonius Rhodius, Argonautica. George W. Mooney. London. Longmans, Green. 1912. Greek text available at the Perseus Digital Library.
Gaius Julius Hyginus, Fabulae from The Myths of Hyginus translated and edited by Mary Grant. University of Kansas Publications in Humanistic Studies. Online version at the Topos Text Project.
Hard, Robin, The Routledge Handbook of Greek Mythology: Based on H.J. Rose's "Handbook of Greek Mythology", Psychology Press, 2004, . Google Books.
Hesiod, Catalogue of Women from Homeric Hymns, Epic Cycle, Homerica translated by Evelyn-White, H G. Loeb Classical Library Volume 57. London: William Heinemann, 1914. Online version at theio.com
Nonnus of Panopolis, Dionysiaca translated by William Henry Denham Rouse (1863-1950), from the Loeb Classical Library, Cambridge, MA, Harvard University Press, 1940.  Online version at the Topos Text Project.
Nonnus of Panopolis, Dionysiaca. 3 Vols. W.H.D. Rouse. Cambridge, MA., Harvard University Press; London, William Heinemann, Ltd. 1940–1942. Greek text available at the Perseus Digital Library.
Pausanias, Description of Greece with an English Translation by W.H.S. Jones, Litt.D., and H.A. Ormerod, M.A., in 4 Volumes. Cambridge, MA, Harvard University Press; London, William Heinemann Ltd. 1918. . Online version at the Perseus Digital Library
Pausanias, Graeciae Descriptio. 3 vols. Leipzig, Teubner. 1903.  Greek text available at the Perseus Digital Library.
Pindar, Odes translated by Diane Arnson Svarlien. 1990. Online version at the Perseus Digital Library.
 Pindar, The Odes of Pindar including the Principal Fragments with an Introduction and an English Translation by Sir John Sandys, Litt.D., FBA. Cambridge, MA., Harvard University Press; London, William Heinemann Ltd. 1937. Greek text available at the Perseus Digital Library.
 Plutarch, Lives with an English Translation by Bernadotte Perrin. Cambridge, MA. Harvard University Press. London. William Heinemann Ltd. 1914. 1. Online version at the Perseus Digital Library. Greek text available from the same website.

Aeolides
Princes in Greek mythology
Kings of Phocis
Kings in Greek mythology
Phocian characters in Greek mythology
Thessalian characters in Greek mythology
Mythology of Phocis
Thessalian mythology